Joseph Eggleston Johnston II (born May 13, 1950) is an American film director, producer, writer, and visual effects artist. He is best known for directing  effects-driven films, including  Honey, I Shrunk the Kids (1989); Jumanji (1995); Jurassic Park III (2001); The Rocketeer (1991); The Wolfman (2010); and Captain America: The First Avenger (2011).

Early life 
Johnston was born in Austin, Texas, and attended California State University, Long Beach, and Pasadena's Art Center College of Design.

Career

Design and visual effects 
Much of the work at the beginning of Johnston's screen career combined design and special effects. He began his career as a concept artist and effects technician on the first Star Wars film, directed by George Lucas, co-created the design of Boba Fett in The Empire Strikes Back, and was art director on one of the effects teams for the sequel Return of the Jedi. His association with Lucas would later prove fruitful, when he became one of four to win an Academy Award for Best Visual Effects for Lucas and Steven Spielberg's film Raiders of the Lost Ark. Johnston continued to work on many films as an effects expert.

He was also associate producer on fantasy Willow, and production designer on two mid-80s TV movies which featured the Ewoks seen in Return of the Jedi.

Johnston is also author of Star Wars novel The Adventures of Teebo: A Tale of Magic and Suspense, which ties into Return of the Jedi (New York: Random House, 1984;).

In 1984, Lucas gave Johnston a sabbatical, with salary, and paid his tuition to attend the USC School of Cinematic Arts. Johnston left after a year, saying he "was asked not to return" because he "broke too many rules".

Directing 
Johnston made his directorial debut in 1989 with hit comedy adventure Honey, I Shrunk the Kids, starring Rick Moranis. He followed it with comic-book adaptation The Rocketeer (1991). The film was a commercial failure, as was his next, the animated and live-action The Pagemaster, starring Macaulay Culkin. Johnston rebounded, directing the family hit Jumanji, starring Robin Williams. The film overcame lukewarm reviews to gross over $260 million.

Johnston was set to direct Hulk, but dropped out in July 1997. Johnston then switched gears from effects-driven action films to the more personal October Sky (1999), starring a teenage Jake Gyllenhaal as a 1950s West Virginia high school student who dreams of being a rocket scientist for NASA against his father's wishes.

Johnston's first project of the 2000s was the sequel Jurassic Park III, which made over US$300 million at the box office. Johnston followed it with western Hidalgo, starring Viggo Mortensen. Johnston then took a six-year directorial break before signing on at a month's notice to take over the 2010 remake of 1941 horror classic The Wolfman. Shot in England, the film starred Benicio del Toro and Anthony Hopkins.

In part thanks to his experience with the period superhero film The Rocketeer, Johnston was selected to direct Marvel Studios superhero adaptation Captain America: The First Avenger. Released on July 22, 2011, the film stars Chris Evans as the comic book hero and Hugo Weaving as his archenemy the Red Skull. In 2012, Johnston directed the thriller Not Safe for Work for Blumhouse Productions.

On December 12, 2017, The Hollywood Reporter reported that Johnston would helm 32 days of reshoots on the film The Nutcracker and the Four Realms due to its director Lasse Hallström being unavailable.

On December 5, 2019, it was reported that Joe Johnston was in negotiations with Disney to direct Shrunk, a legacy sequel to Honey, I Shrunk The Kids.

Filmography

Director
Film

Television

Other credits 
Film

Television

Books written 

 1977: The Star Wars Sketchbook
 1980: The Empire Strikes Back Sketchbook  (with Nilo Rodis-Jamero)
 1983: Return of the Jedi Sketchbook (with Nilo Rodis-Jamero)
 1984: The Adventures of Teebo: A Tale of Magic and Suspense
 2005 : Star Wars : Aux origines du mythe (with Doug Chiang)
 2007 : The Hill Culture
 2011 : The Mack Marsden Murder Mystery
 2014 : Franklin
 2014 : Necessary Evil: Settling Missouri with a Rope and a Gun
 2015 : It's End Here: Missouri's Last Vigilante

Accolades

References

External links 

 

1950 births
Best Visual Effects Academy Award winners
California State University, Long Beach alumni
Film directors from Texas
Action film directors
American people of German descent
American people of Scottish descent
Living people
People from Fort Worth, Texas
Role-playing game artists
Visual effects artists
USC School of Cinematic Arts alumni
American storyboard artists
Industrial Light & Magic people
Fantasy film directors